Archilema cinderella is a moth of the subfamily Arctiinae. It was described by Sergius G. Kiriakoff in 1958, originally under the genus Eilema. It is found in Uganda and Nigeria.

References

Moths described in 1958
Lithosiini
Insects of West Africa
Insects of Uganda
Moths of Africa